Mispillion Lighthouse is a lighthouse in Delaware, United States, located on the Mispillion River near Delaware Bay.

History
The original Mispillion Lighthouse was built in 1831. The second Mispillion Lighthouse was a  square wood tower rising from one corner of a two-story Gothic style wood keeper's house and was built in 1873. It served until 1929, when it was deactivated and replaced by a steel skeleton tower that had originally served at Cape Henlopen. Over many years of private ownership and neglect, the lighthouse had fallen into an extreme state of disrepair, and was considered by Lighthouse Digest magazine to be "America's Most Endangered Lighthouse". After a fire started by lightning destroyed most of the tower portion of the lighthouse, the remains of the lighthouse were sold in 2002. A replica of the lighthouse was rebuilt at Shipcarpenter Square in Lewes, Delaware, in 2004 using what was left of the structure of the old lighthouse, and based on the original plans. The new owners also made a substantial addition during reconstruction, used as their living quarters. The steel skeletal tower remains at the original location but is not active or open to the public.

It was added to the National Register of Historic Places in 1987.

References

External links
 
 
 

Lighthouses completed in 1831
Lighthouses completed in 1873
Lighthouses on the National Register of Historic Places in Delaware
Lighthouses in Sussex County, Delaware
Historic American Engineering Record in Delaware
Milford, Delaware
National Register of Historic Places in Sussex County, Delaware